Skorobogatov is a Russian surname. It is derived from the sobriquet "скоробогатый" ("soon rich"). That may refer to:

 Alexei Skorobogatov, Russian mathematician
 Andrey Skorobogatov, Russian sci-fi writer and rock-musician
 Nikolay Skorobogatov, Russian (soviet) movie actor

Russian-language surnames